Putyatin Island (Russian: Остров Путятина) is an island in  (east part of Peter the Great Gulf), near 50 km east of Vladivostok and 35 km west of Nakhodka. It named after Admiral Yevfimy Putyatin. The island is under Fokino city administration.

Area is 27.9 km2; the highest point is Startsev Mount (353 m over a sea).

Population is 994 (2010). There is only one settlement on the island. Putyatin Island is one of four inhabited islands of Primorsky Krai (the other three are Russky, Popov and Reyneke).

The main branches of economy of island are fish-processing and tourism.

The Island is separated from continental Primorye by a narrow strait (near 1.5 km).

Notes

External links

Islands of the Sea of Japan
Islands of the Russian Far East
Islands of Primorsky Krai